A' Mhaighdean is one of the least accessible of the munros in northern Scotland. A good track then leads to the causeway between the Fionn Loch and Dubh Loch. Follow the path eastwards to about the  level and cross the Allt Bruthach an Esain to gain the North West ridge of the mountain.

The mountain is composed of gneiss, the summit presenting the highest elevation of the Lewisian. Part of the North West ridge is capped by Torridonian sandstone.

Footnotes

Munros
Marilyns of Scotland
Mountains and hills of the Northwest Highlands